Salvia judaica is a species of flowering plant in the Lamiaceae family. It is a perennial commonly called Judean sage that is native to Mediterranean woodlands and shrublands, with violet flowers blooming from April–June.

Notes

External links
USDA Plants Profile

judaica
Flora of Israel
Flora of Lebanon
Flora of Palestine (region)
Taxa named by Pierre Edmond Boissier